Olivewood is a metonymy and the official marking of Cyprus efforts to mature into a high value movie production destination. The term is a portmanteau of "Olive" and "Hollywood". The strategy is predominantly allied to filmmaking for the Cinema of the United States and the Cinema of Europe.

Etymology 
'Olive wood' is historically prized for its durability, colour, high combustion temperature and grain patterns. It’s a tree that derives from the coastal areas of the eastern Mediterranean, where the island of Cyprus is located. The Ancient Greeks farmed and spread it across the Mediterranean Basin. The term ‘Olivewood’ is a portmanteau of "Olive" (wood/tree) and "Hollywood" that syndicates in meaning and significance.

History 
Cyprus world cinema film production dates back to the 1950s, soon after World War II, with They Who Dare as first film noted on location on IMDb. More than 273 titles are credited on location since then, with the latest being Jiu Jitsu, the sci-fi martial arts franchise from Dimitri Logothetis, starring Nicolas Cage, Marie Avgeropoulos, Frank Grillo, Alain Moussi and Tony Jaa. The island is currently considered an up-and-coming film location, especially after the launch of new incentives and a Film Commission. Cyprus climate, landscapes, local talent, infrastructure and financial incentives has boosted its film industry more meaningfully in the past few years.

Climate 
With predictability of weather being a key advantage for film production (340 days of sunshine year round) Cypriot climate becomes a significant production element. The continuum of natural light derives from the fact that Cyprus and Los Angeles are very close to the same latitude. The climate is defined by hot and dry summer from May to October, and a mild green winter with occasional rain showers from December to February. The distinctions are clear between the two main seasons, which are separated by a short autumn and spring.

Locations 
Labelled as a natural film studio, the island has a diverse set of film locations and dissimilar morphology. Cyprus incorporates a historical and cultural landscape ranging from archaeological sites to antiquated villages, ancient city kingdoms, Greek amphitheatres, Byzantine art, 16th century Venetian architecture and modern European cities such as Limassol. Its long coastline, sandy beaches, light houses, ports, as well as pristine Mediterranean waters have been shot in various movie productions. The island incorporates flat plains that look like desert in the summer only to transform with rich green vegetation during the winter. Troodos Mountains provides peaks covered in snow, hilltops, valleys, waterfalls, traditional villages and vineyards. Salt lakes in Larnaca are packed with flamingos in the winter while the Akamas Nature Reserve is protected from any human activities. Notably, the island is the mythological birthplace of Aphrodite.

Inter-connectivity 
The Republic has two deep-sea ports (Limassol & Port of Larnaca) and two international airports (Larnaca and Paphos) with more than 70 airlines operating, serving 120 destinations across 40 countries. Located at the crossroads of three continents, it is a short flight away from many prominent transit hubs. In 2018, Cypriot airports served a total of 11 million passengers. Direct flights to all major European cities are a key factor for productions with multiple locations. The short distances help filming dissimilar locations and reduce production times. Snow-white mountains to sunny beaches might take an hour of drive in an English designated road network. Advanced infrastructure by road, air and sea is supported with logistical solutions and services.

Shooting Permits 
Shooting Permits is a requirement for most purposes. Film Producers must liaison with the key Government Agencies depending on the necessity:
 Department of Civil Aviation
 Deputy Ministry of Tourism
 Department of Antiquities
 Ministry of Health
 National Guard
 Cyprus Police

Genres 
Popular commercial genres since the 1950s include action, comedy, sci-fi, romance, drama and melodrama along with notable documentaries from the BBC and the National Geographic.

Incentives 
An incentive scheme was introduced in 2018 to encourage more international productions. S.O.S: Survive Or Sacrifice featuring William Baldwin was the first film to take advantage of the Olivewood incentive plan.

See also 
 Cinema of Cyprus
 Cyprus International Film Festival

References

 
Film production districts